Hygronoma is a genus of beetles belonging to the family Staphylinidae.

The species of this genus are found in Europe.

Species:
 Hygronoma calida (Bernhauer, 1908) 
 Hygronoma chinensis Pace, 2004

References

Staphylinidae
Staphylinidae genera